Creek frog may refer to:

 Kuhl's creek frog (Limnonectes kuhlii), a frog in the family Dicroglossidae found in Java
 Stone creek frog (Limnonectes macrodon), a frog in the family Dicroglossidae endemic to Sumatra and Java, Indonesia
 Stony creek frog (Litoria wilcoxii), a frog in the family Hylidae endemic to the east coast of Australia

See also

 Frog Creek (disambiguation)

Animal common name disambiguation pages